is an action role-playing video game developed and published by Konami for the Family Computer in 1987 exclusively in Japan. It has been referenced in many subsequent Konami titles throughout the years. The game is structurally similar to Castlevania II: Simon's Quest, The Goonies II and Teenage Mutant Ninja Turtles (NES).

A hack-and-slash "roguevania" sequel, titled Getsu Fūma Den: Undying Moon, was released on the Nintendo Switch on February 9, 2022 and left Early Access on Steam on February 17. A sequel titled Shin Getsu Fūma Den was planned for the PlayStation 2, but was cancelled.

Gameplay
The player controls Fūma, whose goal is to locate the three Pulse Blades that have been stolen from his clan in order to gain access to Ryūkotsuki's lair. Each of these islands requires Fūma to be in possession of a different .

The game starts off from an overhead view where the player guides Fūma to his next destination. When Fūma enters a gate, the game switches to a side-scrolling action scene where the player must go from one end of the area to the next while fending off enemies and avoiding pitfalls in the usual matter in order to return to the main field and proceed to the next scene. In addition to these action scenes, there are also small shrines featuring villagers who will provide hints to Fūma and shops where he can purchase new items and weapons using the money he has accumulated from defeated enemies. The player switches items by pausing the game during an action sequence and then pressing A to select a defensive item or B to change weapons. Experience points are accumulated by defeating enemies, which will fill out Fūma's sword gauge, increasing the strength of his attacks.

When the player reaches the main dungeon in each of the islands, the game switches to a pseudo-3D perspective which follows Fūma from behind. The player must proceed through a labyrinth in order to reach the boss holding one of the Pulse Swords. Each labyrinth is filled with numerous enemies who will confront Fūma, along with allies who will provide him with hints and helpful items. A candle is required to light these labyrinths, as well as a compass which shows Fūma's current direction. When the player reaches the boss's lair, the game switches back to a side-scrolling perspective before the actual confrontation.

The game uses a lives system like most action games. The player loses a life when he runs out of health or falls into a pitfall. When the player runs out of lives, he can continue from where he left off or quit and resume at a later point using a password. The player is penalized by having his money reduced by half.

Plot
The Getsu brothers fought against Ryūkotsuki, each wielding one of the three spiritual  that have been passed within the clan for generations. However, the brothers were ultimately defeated by the demon and only , the youngest of the three, survived. Vowing to avenge his slain brothers, Fūma ventures into  to recover the three stolen Pulse Blades and summon the spirits of his brothers to defeat Ryūkotsuki.

Related games
 Konami Wai Wai World- A side-scrolling action game released for the Famicom in 1988 and Japanese mobile phones (via the Konami Net DX service) in 2006 featuring many Konami characters. The game features Fūma as a playable character, as well as a stage modeled after Kyōki Island called Jigoku. Fūma also appears in the 1991 sequel, Wai Wai World 2.
  Jikkyō Power Pro Wrestling '96: Max Voltage - A pro-wrestling game for the Super Famicom released in 1996.
  Yu-Gi-Oh! Trading Card Game - A collectable trading card game based on the manga. Fūma and Ryūkotsuki (renamed Getsu Fuhma and Ryu Kokki respectively) had their own trading cards, and the TCG has been adapted into three games based on it; Yu-Gi-Oh! GX: Duel Academy in 2005, Yu-Gi-Oh! Ultimate Masters: World Championship 2006 and Yu-Gi-Oh! GX Tag Force in 2006.
 Pop'n Music 18: Sengoku Retsuden - A 2010 installment in the musical rhythm game series released for the arcades. Fūma appears in the background animation for the track "Go! Getsu Fuma", a medley of arranged music based Getsu Fūma Den.  The track is listed under the genre GETSUFUMA-DEN.
 Castlevania: Harmony of Despair - A downloadable game in the Castlevania series released for the PlayStation 3 and Xbox 360. It features downloadable content based on Getsu Fūma Den, namely Fūma himself as a playable character and a stage titled "The Legend of Fuma" which uses graphical assets from the actual Famicom game. This was the first time characters from Getsu Fūma Den were featured in a game released in the west and thus many of the enemy characters and items were given localized names in the English version. 
 Otomedius Excellent - A spinoff in the Gradius series released for the Xbox 360 in 2011 featuring young girls who can transform into spacecraft. The game features a heroine modeled after Fūma named Gesshi Hanafūma. The Stage 3 boss is a female version of Fūma's nemesis, Ryukotsuki.
 Monster Retsuden Oreca Battle - A trading card arcade game distributed exclusively in Japan in 2012. Fūma appears as a boss character.
 Super Smash Bros. Ultimate - A crossover fighting game developed by Bandai Namco and Sora Ltd. and published by Nintendo for the Nintendo Switch. The music track "Go! Getsu Fuma" appears as a selectable song on the Dracula's Castle stage, using its remix from Castlevania: Harmony of Despair.

Soundtrack
The following soundtrack albums featured music from Getsu Fūma Den, in either original or arranged forms.
 Konami Famicom Music Memorial Best VOL.1 (July 21, 1989) - Features three original tracks from the Famicom game.
 Konami Ending Collection (October 21, 1991) - Features the ending theme.
 Winbee's Neo Cinema Club 2 ~Paradise~ (August 5, 1994) - Features a rendition of the ending theme,  arranged by Kenichi Mitsuda.
 Konami Music Masterpiece Collection (October 1, 2004) - Features the three tracks previously included in Konami Famicom Music Memorial Best Vol. 1.
 Konami Addiction ~For Electro Lovers~ (May 21, 2008) - Published by Universal J. Features a remixed medley of the game's soundtrack composed by amos project.
 KONAMI FAMICOM CHRONICLE Vol.3: ROM Cassette Compilation (August 21, 2015) - Published by Egg Music Records. Features the complete soundtrack from the original Famicom game in 14 tracks.

Reception 

Getsu Fūma Den was met with mostly positive reception from critics. Famitsu noted its mixture of elements from both The Adventure of Link and Dragon Buster, with one reviewer stating that "it feels like a sequel to Akumajō Dracula." Family Computer Magazine stated that the game evoked "a surprising and mysterious atmosphere." A writer for Japanese gaming magazine Yuge commended its graphics, direction and music.

Hardcore Gaming 101s Kurt Kalata commended the varied visuals and music but criticized the controls and pseudo-3D dungeon crawling sequences for being tedious. However, the Japanese book 200 Unreasonable Famicom & Sufami Games You Want to Clear Before You Die gave the game a negative retrospective outlook. While similarities with Genpei Tōma Den were pointed out and the overall originality on-display was also commended, they heavily criticized the password system and drawbacks with its gameplay.

Notes

References

External links
Official Virtual Console page

1987 video games
Action role-playing video games
Japan-exclusive video games
Konami games
Metroidvania games
Nintendo Entertainment System games
Post-apocalyptic video games
Role-playing video games
Single-player video games
Video games about demons
Video games about ninja
Video games based on Japanese mythology
Video games set in hell
Virtual Console games
Virtual Console games for Wii U
Video games developed in Japan